Ramdane Djamel is a town and commune in Skikda Province in north-eastern Algeria.

The town is home to football club WA Ramdane Djamel, which currently plays in the Ligue Nationale du Football Amateur. Ramdane Djamel is an important railway junction where the mainline Algiers-Skikda line connects to the Ramdane Djamel-Annaba line as well as to the Ramdane Djamel-Jijel line.

References

Communes of Skikda Province
Cities in Algeria
Algeria